Uittamo is a district in the Uittamo-Skanssi ward of the city of Turku, in Finland. It is located in the south of the city, and is a high-density residential suburb.

The current population of Uittamo is 3,635, and it is decreasing at an annual rate of 2.23%. 11.97% of the district's population are under 15 years old, while 24.10% are over 65. The district's linguistic makeup is 90.65% Finnish, 7.87% Swedish, and 1.49% other.

See also
 Districts of Turku
 Districts of Turku by population

Districts of Turku